Delias eichhorni is a butterfly in the family Pieridae. It was described by Walter Rothschild in 1904. It is found in New Guinea.

The wingspan is about 56 mm. Males have black forewings, with a large triangular area from the hindmargin forwards to R3, penetrating into the cell, truncate-sinuate costally, not extending to the base. There are three white spots beyond the apex of the cell from the costal margin to R3, more or less confluent, the first the smallest and two white subapical spots. The hindwings are mostly white with a somewhat irregular black distal margin band, tapering behind. In females, the forewings are more extended black and have the spots sulphur-yellow. The hindwings are shaded with sulphur-yellow, and have a broader black border, which includes vestigial sulphurous spots.

Subspecies
 D. e. eichhorni (Aroa River, Owen Stanley Range, Papua New Guinea)
 D. e. kerowagi Morinaka, Mastrigt & Sibatani, 1993 (Kerowagi, Papua New Guinea)
 D. e. hagenensis Morinaka, Mastrigt & Sibatani, 1993 (Southern Highland Province, Pap Creek, Papua New Guinea)

References

External links
Delias at Markku Savela's Lepidoptera and Some Other Life Forms

eichhorni
Butterflies described in 1904